Sound of the Underground is the debut studio album by English-Irish girl group Girls Aloud, formed through the ITV television series Popstars: The Rivals. It was released in Ireland on 23 May 2003, in the United Kingdom and Europe on 26 May 2003, and reissued on 17 November 2003 through Polydor. Girls Aloud worked with a variety of musicians and producers on Sound of the Underground, which was largely inspired by 1980s music. Comparisons were made with artists such as Bananarama, The Bangles, Blondie and Spice Girls.

Sound of the Underground debuted to generally favourable reviews from contemporary music critics, who noted the high quality of the album compared to output from other reality show contestants. The album was certified platinum in the United Kingdom by the British Phonographic Industry (BPI). It yielded four singles, including the title track, which topped the UK Singles Chart for a month. The album has sold 368,000 copies in the United Kingdom alone.

Background and recording 
Girls Aloud were formed through the ITV1 programme Popstars: The Rivals by a public vote on 30 November 2002. Their debut single "Sound of the Underground" was one of sixty songs that Brian Higgins and Miranda Cooper had written with the aim of launching their own girl group. The song was originally recorded in 2001 by London girl group Orchid, who disbanded before gaining a firm record deal. It was produced by Xenomania and chosen by Girls Aloud's manager Louis Walsh as their debut single. "Sound of the Underground" was 2002's Christmas number one single and spent a further three weeks at number one. "Sound of the Underground" and another Xenomania production, Sugababes' "Round Round", have been called "two huge groundbreaking hits", credited with reshaping British pop music for the 2000s.

Following the single's success, Girls Aloud proceeded to begin recording their debut album, which shares its title with the single. As the team grew, their music began to take over the nation. Girls Aloud worked with a variety of mostly British musicians and producers, such as Betty Boo, the Beatmasters, Graham Stack, Steve Anderson and Tim Kellett, and reunited with Higgins and Xenomania. Girls Aloud deliberately waited five months after the release of "Sound of the Underground" in order to ensure they would have a strong second single. Referring to their second single "No Good Advice", Higgins said that Girls Aloud initially did not like the song – "we played them some of it, and they said: 'That's not our sound.' I objected to the use of that phrase 'our sound'. I told them they had five minutes to talk about whether or not they wanted to continue with me. They went away and spoke about it and since then it's been fine. They come in expecting to work, and there's a trust there which, I think, dates back to that day."

Sound of the Underground remains Girls Aloud's only studio album not to be entirely written and produced by Higgins and Xenomania, who had initially only created two songs for the album, "Sound of the Underground" and "No Good Advice". When Higgins heard the remaining ten tracks that Girls Aloud had recorded for the album, he promptly called Polydor to complain about the lack of creative content. Higgins said, "They'd sent them off to these other Swedish guys and different people in the UK [...] I said, 'There are two completely separate groups on this record. We need to get rid of six tracks and I'll replace them'. We did that and allowed the album to stand up as a body of work." This last-minute decision resulted in Girls Aloud returning to the studio to record a further four tracks with Xenomania – "Some Kind of Miracle", "Life Got Cold", "Stop" and "Love/Hate". The album was completed in April 2003 and described as a mix of "Blondie and Bananarama, with a smattering of the Spice Girls at their best thrown in."

During the summer of 2003, Girls Aloud would again work with Higgins and Xenomania, recording a further three tracks – a cover version of the Duran Duran hit "Girls on Film", which would become the B-side of "Life Got Cold", "You Freak Me Out" for the film Freaky Friday and a cover version of The Pointer Sisters song "Jump" for the film Love Actually. They also re-recorded "Some Kind of Miracle", which was originally intended to be the fourth single from the album before it was scrapped in favour of "Jump". These four tracks, alongside an altered mix of "Life Got Cold", would eventually surface on a reissued version of Sound of the Underground, which was released on 17 November 2003.

Music and lyrics 

Sound of the Underground takes influence from a number of 1980s genres, such as synthpop, power pop, and new wave, and 1990s styles like big beat, drum and bass, and garage. The album received comparisons to girl groups such as Bananarama, The Bangles and Spice Girls. Similarities to Kylie Minogue and Madonna were also noted. A majority of the songs make use of guitars and electronic beats. The rise of indie rock also inspired Brian Higgins to "blur the edges between commercial music and so-called "indie" music." He continued, "pop music was on its backside and indie music was about to rise, through The Strokes and everything else. We were an independent company and we were as indie as the other bands around us. The guitar riff on "No Good Advice" is very very similar to the riff on the track "Michael" by Franz Ferdinand."

It was said that the album's "lyrics [were] curiously insistent upon Girls Aloud's musical credibility and autonomy of thought." Higgins said that "No Good Advice" reflected his general mood of failure after a special deal between Xenomania and London Records fell through in 2000, and about persisting in spite of what people told him to do or not to do. "Life Got Cold" was labelled "surprisingly poignant."

Songs 
"Sound of the Underground", which opens the album, drew comparisons to Fatboy Slim. It was labelled "an enticing blend of spiky guitars and Fatboy Slim beats topped off with an irresistibly catchy chorus." "Sound of the Underground" was further described as "a mechanistic sashay of twangy surf guitar and sultry gang vocals – Girls Aloud explodes like a five-headed Kylie Minogue." "No Good Advice" was labelled "a disco track with guitar – a cross between Blondie and The Bangles." Unlike many other songs, it was said to be "not obsessed with trying to be a cutting-edge club hit, [...] with at least three different killer hooks welded together" that borrowed heavily from the 1980s. "Some Kind of Miracle", which is "a breezy summer pop song about trying to bag a guy", follows. The Xenomania production had "layered vocals with its slow tempo despite being more formulaic." The song was compared to "a 21st century Bangles", as well as former Spice Girls member and Popstars: The Rivals judge Geri Halliwell.

"All I Need (All I Don't)" was described as "a Kylie-type tune set to squelchy techno", as well as "a disco-funk workout with traces of Cameo and Bedtime Stories vintage Madonna". "Life Got Cold", the album's first ballad and third single, was a late addition to the album, completed by Xenomania shortly before the album's release. The song received attention because of similarities between the guitar riff of "Life Got Cold" and that of the Oasis hit "Wonderwall" (1995). Warner/Chappell Music has since credited Oasis songwriter Noel Gallagher. The song was called a "charming ballad" that was "a sweet but slightly sad pop song". The song begins with a rap. "Mars Attack", produced by Betty Boo and the Beatmasters, "is hip hop-referencing surf punk."

"Stop", a Xenomania production sung entirely by Nadine Coyle apart from the chorus, "starts like the Skids' "Into the Valley" but gets sultry instead of surreal." The album's eighth track, "Girls Allowed", was co-written by Westlife member Brian McFadden. It was described as both "Basement Jaxx meets Spice Girls" and "Donna Summer meets Dannii Minogue". "Forever and a Night" was described as "a soppy love song earmarked as a Christmas single", but slated for sounding like "every girl-group slushy song ever written." "Love/Hate", another song crafted by Xenomania, "lays vocals over garage beats." A second contribution from Betty Boo and the Beatmasters, "Boogie Down Love", follows. It was said that it "mixes the hook of Blondie's "Call Me" with the bells from "Rapture"", as well as being deemed "electro stomping". "Don't Want You Back" was co-written by Anders Bagge, who also wrote Samantha Mumba's "Gotta Tell You", which bears similarities. It was labelled as "love song" in which Girls Aloud are "swooning over bois [sic]". "White Lies" was co-written and produced by Tim Kellett, a former member of The Durutti Column, Simply Red, and Olive.

The original UK edition of the album featured two bonus tracks. "Love Bomb", another Betty Boo collaboration, was compared to Boo's "Where Are You Baby?". "Everything You Ever Wanted" borrows its opening line from The Rolling Stones. In December 2003, the album was re-released with the omission of "Don't Want You Back" and the bonus tracks. Three new songs appeared instead. "Jump", a cover of song "Jump (for My Love)" by The Pointer Sisters, was recorded for the soundtrack to Love Actually (2003). Cheryl Cole noted in Girls Aloud's autobiography Dreams That Glitter – Our Story (2008) that the single "was the point when we realized everything we'd been doing was quite down and moody [...] and that's not what people wanted." "You Freak Me Out" is a pop-rock song that was written and recorded specifically for the Disney film Freaky Friday (2003), Also included was Girls Aloud's cover of "Girls on Film", originally a Duran Duran classic, that originally appeared as a B-side to "Life Got Cold".

Release and promotion
Sound of the Underground was released in Ireland on 23 May 2003 and in the United Kingdom and European countries three days later, through Polydor Records and Universal Music Group. The international versions of the album exclude the bonus tracks "Love Bomb" and "Everything You Ever Wanted". A reissue of Sound of the Underground was released on 17 November 2003. It replaced the original bonus tracks and "Don't Want You Back" with three new songs: "Jump", "You Freak Me Out", and "Girls on Film". The radio edit of "Life Got Cold" and a remix of "Some Kind of Miracle" replaced the original versions. Originally, the album would be promoted with a tour with their fellow Popstars: The Rivals contestants; however, the tour was cancelled due to poor ticket sales. Instead, the group promoted the album on their What Will the Neighbours Say...? Tour (2005) along with their second studio album What Will the Neighbours Say? (2004). Sound of the Underground and other Girls Aloud releases were made available for sale on the US iTunes Store on 26 June 2007 through Interscope Records.

Singles 
"Sound of the Underground", Girls Aloud's debut single, was released on 16 December 2002. Competing against the Popstars: The Rivals boyband, One True Voice, they used a combative "Buy girls, bye boys" slogan to persuade the public to buy their single. "Sound of the Underground" received a positive response from most music critics. The music video was shot in a London warehouse just days after Girls Aloud's formation in the last week of competition of Popstars: The Rivals. "Sound of the Underground" debuted at number one on the UK Singles Chart and spent four consecutive weeks at number one, earning a platinum certification in March 2003. "No Good Advice" was released five months later in May 2003. In 2003, the song won the Popjustice £20 Music Prize, awarded to the best British pop single of the past year. The video for "No Good Advice" features the members of Girls Aloud clad in metallic, silver, futuristic outfits which can also be seen on the cover of this album. The song debuted at number two. The third single was intended to be "Some Kind of Miracle", but was changed to fan favourite "Life Got Cold". The music video depicts the band members in stunted movement, wandering around an abandoned city setting. The song failed to achieve the success of Girls Aloud's first two singles, peaking at number three. "Some Kind of Miracle" was replaced again, this time with their cover of "Jump", recorded for the Love Actually soundtrack. The music video for "Jump" was made to appear like it was intertwined with Love Actually. The song debuted at number two on the UK Singles Chart. "You Freak Me Out" was due for release, with Girls Aloud even performing it on television; however, Girls Aloud proceeded to record their second studio album What Will the Neighbours Say?.

Critical reception

Sound of the Underground received generally favourable reviews from music critics. The Times noted that Sound of the Underground "is packed with everything you want from a pop record – attitude, aggression, guitars, disco beats and steals from Phil Spector." Yahoo! Music said that Girls Aloud "have made a seriously fine debut album. OK, so it's not Blonde on Blonde, Innervisions or OK Computer, but it may well be another Spice." A number of reviews noted the high quality of the album compared to output from other reality show contestants. It was said that "Girls Aloud are on the better end of the commercial pop scale." Ian Youngs of BBC News bluntly stated, "Reality pop is not supposed to be this good." BBC Music said "time will tell if they are set to take the mantle as the new Spice Girls or slip rapidly down pops dumper as the new Hear'Say. But their debut album is sure to shut up at least some of their cynics, myself included."

However, many reviewers agreed that the album's quality declined towards the end. RTÉ.ie wrote, "After a while it does start sounding a bit samey but for a manufactured pop album, this is a fairly standard fault." The ballads featured on Sound of the Underground were slated. Andrew Lynch of entertainment.ie said that "the ill-advised attempt to show off their sensitive side results in some truly dismal ballads."

Commercial performance
The album debuted at number two on the UK Albums Chart behind Justin Timberlake's debut studio album Justified (2002). Selling 38,000 copies in its first week it went on to sell 300,000, achieving a platinum certificate, their first of many. Spending only eighteen weeks in the charts the album was later re-released to feature new songs. This release only managed to peak at number forty-two but is now the only commercial print of the album.

The album was certified gold by the British Phonographic Industry (BPI) on 6 June 2003. It was certified platinum five months later.

Track listing
Credits adapted from the liner notes of Sound of the Underground.

Covers and other appearances
"Jump" is a cover of The Pointer Sisters.
"Girls on Film" is a cover of the UK band Duran Duran.
The track "Girls on Film" appeared as a B-side to their single "Life Got Cold".
The tracks "Love Bomb" and "Girls Allowed" appeared as B-sides to their single "Jump".
"You Freak Me Out" was recorded specially for the film Freaky Friday.

Charts

Weekly charts

Year-end charts

Certifications

Release history

References

2003 debut albums
Albums produced by Brian Rawling
Albums produced by Xenomania
Girls Aloud albums
Polydor Records albums